The 2012 Open de Suède Vårgårda – team time trial was the 5th team time trial running on the Open de Suède Vårgårda.

Results (top 10)

DNF = did not finish

Results from worldcupvargarda.se.

References

External links
 Official website

Open de Suède Vårgårda
2012 UCI Women's Road World Cup
2012 in women's road cycling
2012 in Swedish sport